Disconnected is a 2007 collaboration album between the German krautrock group Faust and Nurse with Wound .

Track listing
 "Lass Mich"
 "Disconnected"
 "Tu M’Entends?"
 "It Will Take Time"
 (silence)
 "Hard-Rain" (only available on the first CD edition)

References

2007 albums
Faust (band) albums